Freestyle skiing at the 2018 Winter Olympics was held at the Bokwang Phoenix Park in Pyeongchang, South Korea. The events were scheduled to take place between 9 and 23 February 2018. A total of ten freestyle skiing events were held.

Qualification

A maximum of 282 quota spots were available to athletes at the games. A maximum of 30 athletes could be entered by a National Olympic Committee, with a maximum of 16 men or 16 women. Each event had a specific quota amount allocated to it.

Competition schedule
The following was the competition schedule for all ten events.

Sessions that included the event finals are shown in bold.

All times are (UTC+9).

Medal summary

Medal table

Men's events

Women's events

Participating nations
A total of 268 athletes from 27 nations (including the IOC's designation of Olympic Athletes from Russia) were scheduled to participate (the numbers of athletes are shown in parentheses).

References

External links
Official Results Book – Freestyle skiing

 
2018
2018 Winter Olympics events
Winter Olympics
Freestyle skiing competitions in South Korea